Tundrikha is a rural locality (a selo) and the administrative center of Tundrikhinsky Selsoviet, Zalesovsky District, Altai Krai, Russia. The population was 441 as of 2013. There are 6 streets.

Geography 
Tundrikha is located 15 km west of Zalesovo (the district's administrative centre) by road. Zaplyvino is the nearest rural locality.

References 

Rural localities in Zalesovsky District